is a Japanese badminton player.

Achievements

BWF International Challenge/Series
Women's doubles

 BWF International Challenge tournament
 BWF International Series tournament
 BWF Future Series tournament

External links

References 

Japanese female badminton players
Sportspeople from Nara Prefecture
1990 births
Living people